Hayel Daoud is the Jordanian former minister of Awqaf and Religious Affairs. He is also termed as the Country's Islamic affairs minister.

References 

Jordanian politicians
Living people
Year of birth missing (living people)
Islamic affairs ministers of Jordan
Place of birth missing (living people)